= Bolos (Thrace) =

Town of ancient Thrace

Coordinates: 41°01′37″N 28°58′33″E

Bolos (Greek: Βόλος) was a town of ancient Thrace, inhabited during Roman times.

Its site is located in the eastern part of Galata in European Turkey.
